The men's tournament was one of two handball tournaments at the 1984 Summer Olympics. It was the fifth appearance of a men's handball tournament as a medal event at the Olympic Games.

Results

Preliminary round
Teams in two groups played each other in a round to decide, for which place each of them should compete in the Final Round.

Group A

Group B

Final Round
1st-placed teams from each group competed for the 1st place in this round; 
2nd-placed - competed for the 3rd place 
3rd-placed - competed for the 5th place 
4th-placed - competed for the 7th place
5th-placed - competed for the 9th place
6th-placed - competed for the 11th place
All matches were held on 10 August.

11th place match
South Korea 25-21 Algeria
9th place match
United States 24-16 Japan
7th place match
Switzerland 18-17 Spain
5th place match
Sweden 26-24 Iceland
3rd place match
Romania 23-19 Denmark
1st place match
Yugoslavia 18-17 West Germany

Summary

References

Men's tournament
Men's events at the 1984 Summer Olympics